Started with a Song is the major label debut album by Canadian country music artist Brett Kissel. It was released on October 1, 2013, via Warner Music Canada.

Started with a Song was nominated for Country Album of the Year at the 2014 Juno Awards.

Critical reception
Amanda Ash of the Edmonton Journal gave the album four stars out of five, calling it "a wham-bam collection of 10 sweeping love songs and lively party anthems that leave you glossy-eyed and daydream drunk." Ash wrote that "his songs like to play hooky with pop punches and rock growls, making for a cross-genre record that will surely befriend a very large audience."

Track listing

Chart performance

Album

Singles

References

2013 albums
Brett Kissel albums
Warner Music Group albums